Kilsfjord is a fjord in Kragerø municipality, Telemark county, Norway. 

Kilsfjord is a continuation of Kragerøfjorden. Kilsfjord extends west from  Tåtøy, an island in the archipelago just south of Kragerø.  The area goes in a westerly direction and  broadens  further in. It then turns to the north and narrows sharply again, before ending at the village of Kil at the head of the fjord.

The Kragerø River (Kragerøvassdraget) flows into the north eastern side of the fjord, about three miles west of  Kragerøfjorden . Highway 351 follows the south side of the fjord.

References

Kragerø
Fjords of Vestfold og Telemark